Downstream is a 2010 post-apocalyptic film that takes place in a near-future dystopia where gasoline is scarce and a drifter tries to reach a rumored utopian city, Plutopia, powered by clean energy. The film is directed by Simone Bartesaghi and co-directed, written, and produced by Philip Y. Kim.

Cast
 Wes - Jonathon Trent
 Sara - Elizabeth Roberts
 Tobias - Jonno Roberts
 Tabitha - Fiona Gubelmann
 Elder Daniel - Lenny Von Dohlen
 Edward - Billy Drago
 Hungry Joe - Joseph Whipp
 Food Vendor - Mickey Jones
 Frenchy- Emilien De Falco

References

External links
 
 

2010 films
2010 science fiction action films
American science fiction action films
American dystopian films
American post-apocalyptic films
Peak oil films
2010s English-language films
2010s American films